James D. Gronna (August 7, 1884 – May 11, 1963) was a  North Dakota Republican Party politician.

Biography
His father was US Senator Asle Gronna and his mother was Bertha M. Gronna.
James D. Gronna served as the Secretary of State of North Dakota from 1935 to 1940. He first won election to the position in 1934, and served until 1940 when he did not seek re-election. He died in Grand Forks, North Dakota at the age of 78 in 1963.

Notes

External links

1884 births
1963 deaths
Secretaries of State of North Dakota
Politicians from Grand Forks, North Dakota
North Dakota Republicans
American people of Norwegian descent
20th-century American politicians